John Gary Emmanuel (born 1 February 1954) is a former Wales under-23 international footballer who played as a midfielder. He made 372 appearances in the Football League, playing for Birmingham City, Bristol Rovers, Swindon Town, Newport County, Bristol City and Swansea City.

After his Football League career finished, he went on to play for several non-league clubs in Wales, and had a brief spell as manager of Haverfordwest County, while working for the Post Office.

Family
His father, Len was a Wales schoolboy international who played at left back for Swansea Town and Newport County. His uncle, Tom Emanuel played at left-back for Swansea Town and Southampton in the 1930s and 1940s.

References
General
 
 
Specific

1954 births
Living people
Footballers from Swansea
Welsh footballers
Wales under-23 international footballers
Association football midfielders
Birmingham City F.C. players
Bristol Rovers F.C. players
Swindon Town F.C. players
Newport County A.F.C. players
Bristol City F.C. players
Swansea City A.F.C. players
Merthyr Tydfil F.C. players
Llanelli Town A.F.C. players
Welsh football managers
Haverfordwest County A.F.C. managers